This list of Nepenthes cultivars is a comprehensive catalog of all cultivars of the carnivorous plant genus Nepenthes, as recognised by the International Carnivorous Plant Society (ICPS).

The ICPS has been the International Registration Authority (IRA) for carnivorous plant cultivars since 1998. This list includes the 241 Nepenthes cultivars included in the ICPS's official list. This is by far the greatest number of cultivars of any carnivorous plant genus.

The year in brackets is the year of first publication or, in the case of unpublished names, the year of its earliest known usage. Some cultivar names have been used more than once.

See also

Lists of cultivars

References

 *
Lists of cultivars
Nepenthes04 Cultivars